State Highway 49 (SH-49) is a state highway in Bihar State. This state highway passes through two major districts (Vaishali district, Samastipur district).

Route
The route of SH-49 from west to east is as follows:

 Hajipur
 Dighikala west
 Mahua 
 Tajpur (Samastipur)
 Samastipur

References

State Highways in Bihar
Transport in Hajipur